Oskar Johann Viktor Anderson (] – 12 February 1960) was a Russian-German mathematician of Baltic German descent. He is best known for his work on mathematical statistics and econometrics.

Life 
Anderson was born from a Baltic German family in Minsk (now in Belarus), but soon moved to Kazan (Russia). His father, Nikolai Anderson, was professor in Finno-Ugric languages at the University of Kazan. His older brothers were the folklorist Walter Anderson and the astrophysicist Wilhelm Anderson.

Oskar Anderson graduated from Kazan Gymnasium with a gold medal in 1906. After studying mathematics for one year at the University of Kazan, he moved to St. Petersburg to study economics at the Polytechnic Institute. From 1907 to 1915, he was Aleksandr Chuprov's student and assistant. In 1912 he married Margarethe Natalie von Hindenburg-Hirtenberg, a granddaughter of  who was commemorated in "The Funeral of 'The Universal Man'" in Dostoyevsky's A Writer's Diary, and started lecturing at a commercial school in St. Petersburg while also studying for a law degree at the University of Saint Petersburg, graduating in 1914.

In 1918 he took on a professorship in Kiev but he was forced to flee Russia in 1920 due to the Russian Revolution, first taking a post in Budapest (Hungary) before becoming a professor at the University of Economics at Varna (Bulgaria) in 1924.
 
Anderson was one of the charter members of the Econometric Society, whose members also elected him to be a fellow of the society in 1933. In the same year he also received a fellowship from the Rockefeller Foundation.

Supported by the foundation, in 1935 he established and became director of the Statistical Institute for Economic Research at the University of Sofia. For the remainder of the decade he also served the League of Nations as an associate member of its Committee of Statistical Experts.

In 1942 he joined the Kiel Institute for the World Economy as head of the Department of Eastern Studies and also took up a full professorship of statistics at the University of Kiel, where he was joined by his brother Walter after the end of the second world war. In 1947 he took a position at the University of Munich, teaching there until 1956, when he retired.

Writings 
 Einführung in die Mathematische Statistik, Wien : Springer-Verlag, 1935,  
 Über die repräsentative Methode und deren Anwendung auf die Aufarbeitung der Ergbnisse der bulgarischen landwirtschaftlichen Betriebszählung vom 31. Dezember 1926, München : , 1949
 Die Saisonschwankungen in der deutschen Stromproduktion vor und nach dem Kriege , München : Inst. f. Wirtschaftsforschung, 1950

External links

References/Further reading

 
 
 

1887 births
1960 deaths
Mathematicians from Kazan
Baltic German people from the Russian Empire
Mathematicians from the Russian Empire
German statisticians
Statisticians from the Russian Empire
20th-century German mathematicians
Kazan Federal University alumni
Peter the Great St. Petersburg Polytechnic University alumni
Saint Petersburg State University alumni
Academic staff of the University of Kiel
Academic staff of the Ludwig Maximilian University of Munich
Academic staff of Sofia University
Academics of the London School of Economics
Fellows of the American Statistical Association
Fellows of the Econometric Society
Fellows of the Royal Statistical Society
Fellows of the Institute of Mathematical Statistics
Fellows of the American Association for the Advancement of Science
Rockefeller Fellows
White Russian emigrants to Hungary
Hungarian emigrants to Bulgaria
Bulgarian emigrants to Germany